Muldrow is an unincorporated community in Oktibbeha County, Mississippi, United States, located northeast of Starkville and southwest of West Point.

History
A variant name is "Muldrow Station". A station on the Illinois Central Railroad once operated here.  The population in 1900 was 41.

References 

Unincorporated communities in Oktibbeha County, Mississippi
Unincorporated communities in Mississippi